Wild Icefalls are extensive icefalls at the head of Beardmore Glacier, between Mount Wild and Mount Buckley. Named by the New Zealand Geological Survey Antarctic Expedition (NZGSAE) (1961–62) in association with nearby Mount Wild.

Icefalls of the Ross Dependency
Shackleton Coast